The Ofori-Atta family is composed of the bearers of an Akan language patronymic surname and their relatives. The family is of royal Akyem origins and has been active in business, politics, law and government in Ghana.

Origin of the surname
The name Ofori-Atta is derived from the regnal name of the family's founder, Nana Sir Ofori Atta I. Although matrilineality dictated that his progeny be denied the royal succession, their inheritance of the surname highlights the fact that they are direct descendants of the king of that name.

Notable members of the family
Notable members of the Ghanaian political dynasty include:

 Ofori Atta I (1881 – 1943), who was the Okyenhene or King of Akyem Abuakwa
 J. B. Danquah (1895 – 1965),  member of "The Big Six", politician and writer, famous for helping to name Ghana
Paul Danquah, (born Joseph Paul Walcott; 1925 – 2015), British film actor 
 William Ofori Atta (1910 – 1988), a founding member of the United Gold Coast Convention, one of "The Big Six" detained by the Gold Coast colonial government after the 1948 Accra riots and later foreign minister (1971 – 1972)
 Kofi Asante Ofori-Atta (1912 – 1978), politician and the fourth Speaker of the Parliament of Ghana
 Susan Ofori-Atta (1917 – 1985), first woman medical doctor of the Gold Coast
 Adeline Akufo-Addo, née Nana Yeboakua Ofori-Atta (1917 – 2004), daughter of Ofori-Atta I, wife of second republic president of Ghana Edward Akufo-Addo, and mother of Nana Akufo-Addo
Jones Ofori Atta (1937– 2020), economist and politician, Deputy Minister of Finance, 1969–1972
 Nana Akufo-Addo (born 1944), politician and current President of Ghana
 Ken Ofori-Atta (born 1959), investment banker, co-founder of Databank in Ghana and current finance minister
 Nana Oforiatta Ayim, award-winning writer, art historian and filmmaker
 Kwesi Amoako-Atta (1920-1963), Minister of Finance (1964-1966), Deputy Governor, Bank of Ghana (1960-1964), son of Ofori-Atta I

See also
Casely-Hayford 

 
Ghanaian families
Political families
Patronymic surnames
Presbyterian families
Ghanaian royalty
Ghanaian Presbyterians
Akan people